Myaingtha may refer to several places in Burma:

Myaingtha, Homalin, Sagaing Region
Myaingtha, Shwegu, Kachin State